What's Worth While? is a 1921 American silent drama film written and directed by Lois Weber and starring Claire Windsor, Arthur Stuart Hull, Mona Lisa, Louis Calhern, and Edwin Stevens. The film was released on February 27, 1921, by Paramount Pictures.

Cast 
Claire Windsor as Phoebe Jay Morrison
Arthur Stuart Hull as Mr. Morrison
Mona Lisa as Sophia
Louis Calhern as 'Squire' Elton
Edwin Stevens as Rowan

Preservation status
A print of What's Worth While? is in the collection of the Library of Congress Packard Campus.

References

External links

 
 
Film stills at clairewindsor.weebly.com

1921 films
1920s English-language films
Silent American drama films
1921 drama films
Paramount Pictures films
Films directed by Lois Weber
American black-and-white films
American silent feature films
1920s American films